Buddleja cordobensis is a species endemic to dry hillsides in the Argentine provinces of Córdoba, San Luís, and La Rioja at altitudes of 700–1500 m; it was first described and named by Grisebach in 1874.

Description
Buddleja cordobensis is a dioecious densely branched shrub 1–2 m high, with grey fissured bark. The young branches are terete and tomentose, bearing  coriaceous, ovate leaves 2–8 cm long by 0.5–2 cm wide, thickly tomentose on both surfaces, with 0.5 cm petioles. The deep yellow inflorescences comprise one terminal and < 9 pairs of globose heads 0.6–1 cm in diameter, each with 12–25 flowers; the corolla tubes are 3–4 mm long.

The species is considered closely related to B. araucana and B. aromatica.

Cultivation
The shrub is not known in the UK.

References

cordobensis
Flora of Argentina
Flora of South America
Dioecious plants